Nasir Hossain (born 30 November 1991) is a Bangladeshi cricketer.  He represents Rangpur Division at domestic level. He made his international debut for Bangladesh in August 2011.

Asian Games
Hossain was a part of the 13-man Bangladesh squad that played in the 2010 Asian Games in late November. The team played Afghanistan in the final and won by five wickets, gaining the country's first gold medal at the Asian Games.

Domestic career

Bangladesh Premier League 
The Bangladesh Cricket Board (BCB) launched the six-team Bangladesh Premier League in 2012, a twenty20 tournament to be held in February that year. An auction was held for teams to buy players, and Hossain was bought by the Khulna Royal Bengal for $200,000, the highest price paid for a Bangladeshi player.

In October 2018, Hossain was named in the squad for the Sylhet Sixers team, following the draft for the 2018–19 Bangladesh Premier League.

In November 2019, he was selected to play for the Chattogram Challengers in the 2019–20 Bangladesh Premier League.

National Cricket League 
In December 2017, Hossain scored 295 in the second innings batting for Rangpur Division against Barisal Division in the 2017–18 National Cricket League.

T10 League 
In December 2020, Hossain was picked by Pune Devils for the 2021 T10 League. He was appointed as captain for the team In his debut match, he got the figure of 3/18 in 2 overs and also won the match by 7 wickets.

International career
Hossain made his ODI debut on 14 August 2011 against Zimbabwe. Coming in with Bangladesh's score at 58 for 6, the 19-year-old Hossain top-scored for his side with 63 runs from 92 balls, lifting the score to 188. It was not enough, and Zimbabwe won by seven wickets. In the final game of the five-match series, Hossain accidentally injured Zimbabwe fast bowler Keegan Meth. Hossain drove a delivery from Meth straight back and the bowler was unable to get out of the way. He was struck in the mouth, knocking out three teeth.

After losing the ODI series against Zimbabwe 3–2, Bangladesh hosted the West Indies in October for a T20I, three ODIs, and two Tests. In the second ODI, he scored his second half-century. He again came to the wicket with Bangladesh struggling and scored 50 from 54 deliveries. In the final match of the ODI series, which Bangladesh lost 2–1, Hossain took his first wickets in the format. His first was that of left-handed opening batsman Kieran Powell with a delivery that pitched on leg stump and spun to hit the off stump. On a turning pitch Hossain's two wickets for three runs (2/3) helped Bangladesh bowl West Indies out for 61, their second lowest score, and win the match.

Starting in November, Pakistan toured Bangladesh. In the second of three ODIs Hossain scored his maiden international century. He scored 100 runs off 134 balls and was selected Man of the Match for his efforts, though Bangladesh found lost.

In April 2012 the BCB awarded Nasir a central contract for the first time.

He scored his maiden test century against Sri Lanka at Galle on 11 March 2013. He scored 100 off 151 balls with 9 fours. And in the 1st ODI against Sri Lanka he scored at Sooriyawewa, Hambantota on 23 March 2013 he played a magnificent innings of 73 of 59 ball and he was not out. In 3rd ODI The Bangladesh dugout is ecstatic and it has been a brilliant innings under pressure by Nasir Hossain 33(27b).

In 2015, Hossain helped Bangladesh to their most successful run in the 2015 Cricket World Cup. On 12 July, he got his career best 3 for 26 against South Africa to help them win the second ODI and subsequently leading to the series win over the proteas. His catches has been very vital in Bangladesh winning the series against India and South Africa.

In April 2018, Hossain tore his right knee ligament after sustaining an injury while playing football. He needed an operation and as a result he was out of cricket for around six months.

Personal life
Nasir grew up in Bogra, Bangladesh.

At the start of 2021, Nasir was caught up in a controversial marriage. On 14 February 2021, Hossain married Tamima Sultana Tammi.

References

External links

1991 births
Living people
People from Rangpur District
Bangladesh One Day International cricketers
Bangladeshi cricketers
21st-century Bangladeshi cricketers
Cricketers at the 2015 Cricket World Cup
Asian Games gold medalists for Bangladesh
Asian Games bronze medalists for Bangladesh
Asian Games medalists in cricket
Cricketers at the 2010 Asian Games
Cricketers at the 2014 Asian Games
Bangladesh Test cricketers
Bangladesh Twenty20 International cricketers
Rangpur Riders cricketers
Khulna Tigers cricketers
Rangpur Division cricketers
Dhaka Dominators cricketers
Sylhet Strikers cricketers
Victoria Sporting Club cricketers
Prime Doleshwar Sporting Club cricketers
Chittagong Division cricketers
Bangladesh North Zone cricketers
Barisal Division cricketers
Rajshahi Division cricketers
Bangladesh A cricketers
Medalists at the 2010 Asian Games
Medalists at the 2014 Asian Games
South Asian Games gold medalists for Bangladesh
South Asian Games medalists in cricket